John Ferguson "Fergie" Browne (November 11, 1920 – June 9, 2014) was a Canadian politician, manager and traffic manager.

Born in Regina, Saskatchewan, he was elected to the House of Commons of Canada as a Member of the Progressive Conservative Party in the 1958 election to represent the riding of Vancouver Kingsway. Prior to his federal political experience, he served during World War II in the Canadian Army in Canada, England, France, Belgium, the Netherlands and Germany. For his service, he was awarded the 1939-45 Star, the France and Germany Star, the War Medal, the Defence Medal and the Canadian Volunteer Service Medal with Overseas Clasp. He died at a Vancouver hospital on June 9, 2014.

References

1920 births
2014 deaths
Members of the House of Commons of Canada from British Columbia
Politicians from Regina, Saskatchewan
Progressive Conservative Party of Canada MPs
Candidates in the 1957 Canadian federal election
Candidates in the 1962 Canadian federal election
Candidates in the 1963 Canadian federal election
Canadian military personnel of World War II